Sai Yok Noi is a waterfall, also known as Khao Phang Waterfall, in the Tenasserim Hills, Sai Yok District of Kanchanaburi Province, Thailand, near the town Nam Tok Sai Yok Noi. It is the most popular attraction of the Sai Yok National Park.
The waterfall consists of the limestone cliffs collapsing and that became the origin of the name "Khao Phang Waterfall”. The upstream falls from the mountain and flows along the limestone cliffs about 15-meter high. It is popular among domestic and foreign tourists alike, in part because it lies next to the province's trunk road alongside which there is ample parking space.

The Krasae Cave, a small Buddhist shrine next to a section of rail tracks of the Death Railway and the Dawadung Cave, a secluded collection of stalactites, are located near the waterfall. Hellfire Pass Memorial, a museum and tribute to those lost during the construction of the Death Railway's cuttings and trestle bridges, lies about 35km to the west of Sai Yok Noi falls. A small market geared toward travelers is also nearby. Sai Yok Yai waterfall, some 40km to the west lies offset from the valley's main road, adjacent to the Sai Yok National Park Headquarters. It comprises a 10-metre (32ft) picturesque cascade which drops directly into the Kwae Noi River.

References 

Waterfalls of Thailand
Geography of Kanchanaburi province
Tourist attractions in Kanchanaburi province